Gradišče  may refer to several places:

In Austria:
 Gradišče, Slovene name for Schloßberg (Leibnitz)

In Italy:
 Gradišče ob Soči, Slovene name for Gradisca d'Isonzo

In Slovenia:
 Dolenje Gradišče, Dolenjske Toplice, a settlement in the Municipality of Dolenjske Toplice
 Dolenje Gradišče pri Šentjerneju, a settlement in the Municipality of Šentjernej
 Gorenje Gradišče, Dolenjske Toplice, a settlement in the Municipality of Dolenjske Toplice
 Gorenje Gradišče pri Šentjerneju, a settlement in the Municipality of Šentjernej
 Lake Gradišče, a lake near Lukovica
 Gradišče, Grosuplje, a settlement in the Municipality of Grosuplje
 Gradišče, Kozje, a settlement in the Municipality of Kozje
 Gradišče nad Prvačino, a settlement in the Municipality of Nova Gorica
 Gradišče na Kozjaku, a settlement in the Municipality of Selnica ob Dravi
 Gradišče pri Divači, a settlement in the Municipality of Divača
 Gradišče pri Litiji, a settlement in the Municipality of Šmartno pri Litiji
 Gradišče pri Lukovici, a settlement in the Municipality of Lukovica
 Gradišče pri Materiji, a settlement in the Municipality of Hrpelje–Kozina
 Gradišče pri Ormožu, a settlement in the Municipality of Sveti Tomaž
 Gradišče pri Raki, a settlement in the Municipality of Krško
 Gradišče pri Štjaku, a settlement in the Municipality of Sežana
 Gradišče pri Trebnjem, a settlement in the Municipality of Trebnje
 Gradišče pri Vipavi, a settlement in the Municipality of Vipava
 Gradišče pri Vojniku, a settlement in the Municipality of Vojnik
 Gradišče pri Zalem Hribu, former name of Gradišče nad Prvačino
 Gradišče, Škofljica, a settlement in the Municipality of Škofljica
 Gradišče, Slovenj Gradec, a settlement in the City Municipality of Slovenj Gradec
 Gradišče, Šmartno pri Litiji, a settlement in the Municipality of Šmartno pri Litiji
 Gradišče, Tišina, a settlement in the Municipality of Tišina 
 Gradišče, Velike Lašče, a settlement in the Municipality of Velike Lašče
 Gradišče, Videm, a settlement in the Municipality of Videm
 Gradišče v Slovenskih Goricah, former name of Sveta Trojica v Slovenskih Goricah
 Gradišče v Tuhinju, a settlement in the Municipality of Kamnik
 Zgornje Gradišče, a settlement in the Municipality of Šentilj